The Law of Enclosures is a 1996 novel by Dale Peck, which was adapted into the 2000 film  The Law of Enclosures by Canadian director John Greyson.

A cross between a conventional novel and a memoir, the book dramatizes the marital relationship of Henry and Beatrice, characters based on Peck's real-life parents, depicted in alternating time frames ranging from a young couple first falling in love to an older couple renewing their bond after 40 years of marriage.

1996 American novels
American novels adapted into films
Farrar, Straus and Giroux books